Jacques-Nicolas Tardieu, called "Tardieu fils" or "Tardieu the younger", (2 September 1716 – 9 July 1791) was a French engraver.

Biography

Jacques-Nicolas Tardieu was born on 2 September 1716 in Paris.
He was the son of Marie-Anne Horthemels and Nicolas-Henri Tardieu, both engravers.
He was taught by his father, who was recognized as one of the most eminent engravers France has produced.
He was received at the Académie française on 24 October 1749 for his engraved portraits of Bon Boullogne (after Gilles Allou) and Le Lorrain (after Donat Nonnotte). 
He became graveur ordinaire du roi (Official Engraver to the King) and is also described as graveur ordinaire of the Elector of Cologne.

Tardieu married in turn two print makers, Jeanne-Louise-Françoise Duvivier and Élisabeth-Claire Tournay.
Jeanne-Louise is on record as having made several engravings.  
Her father, Jean Duvivier, and her brother, Pierre-Simon-Benjamin Duvivier, were both medal engravers, members of the Academy and graveurs du roi (King's Engravers). Jeanne-Louise died on 6 April 1762.
Tardieu's second wife, Élisabeth Claire (1731 – 3 May 1773) was also an engraver.
Her works included The Concert after Jean François de Troy, La Marchande de moutarde (The Mustard Merchant) after Charles François Hutin, La Dame de Charité (The Charitable Lady), Le Prêtre du Catéchisme (The Catechist) and La Vieille Coquette (The Old Coquette) after Pierre Louis Dumesnil, and Le Joli Dormir (The Repose) after Étienne Jeaurat.  The tendency for wives to become prominent artists beside their husbands was unusual at the time but was common in the Tardieu family.

Jacques-Nicolas Tardieu died in Paris on 9 July 1791.
His son Jean-Charles Tardieu became a well-known painter.

Œuvres 
Tardieu made less use of the point graver than his father, and more use of the Burin, or cold chisel.
As a result, his prints are more precise. It has been said, however, that they are "inferior in spirit and picturesqueness of effect."
He made some of the plates for the Gallery of Versailles, after paintings by Charles Le Brun.
His greatest ability may have been in portraits, such as those of his father and of Alexis Simon Belle, Pierre Jeannin and Mademoiselle du Bocage.  His most notable portrait was that of the queen Marie Leszczyńska, after Jean-Marc Nattier.

Tardieu's portraits include:
Louis XV, after Vanloo
Queen Marie Leszczyńska, wife of Louis XV after Jean-Marc Nattier
Marie Henriette of France after Jean-Marc Nattier
The Archbishop of Bordeaux after Jean Restout the younger
Robert Lorraine, sculptor to the King and Bou Boullogne, Painter to the King 1749
Other well-known works are:
Christ appearing to the Virgin after Guido
Mary Magdalene penitant after Paolo Pagnani
The pool of Bethesda after Jean Restout
The Miseries of War after Teniers
A pair of landscapes after Cochin the Younger.

Other works are:
 Le Paralytique guéri près de la piscine, after the painting by Jean Restout, Arras, Musée des beaux-arts, 1743 
 La Sainte Famille, after Christophe
 Constantin qui se fait apporter l’étendard où était travaillé le signe qu’il avait vu dans le ciel
 L’Éloquence, allégorie, after de La Joue, 1745
 Une vignette des armes du roi, avec des anges pour supports, after the drawing by M. Boucher
 Portrait du président Jeannin, ministre d’État sous Henri IV
 Portrait du maréchal Dubourg, after M. de Leyn
 Portrait de M. Belle, peintre du roi, after the painting done by himself
 Portrait de M. Tardieu, le père, graveur du roi, after Charles-André van Loo
 Vignette représentant le portrait du roi, after a sketch by M. Duvivier, 1746
 Portail de l’église de Saint-Sulpice (pour la description de la dédicace de cette église)
 Portrait de feu Mgr le Dauphin duc de Bourgogne, after Rigaud
 Portrait de feu M. l’abbé de Rothelin, after Noël-Nicolas Coypel
 Portrait de l’archevêque électeur de Cologne, 1748
 Portrait of M. le duc de Sully, author of the Mémoires sur l’histoire d’Henri IV
 Portrait de M. de Boccage, after the painting by Marianne Loir
 Docteur alchimiste, after David Teniers the Younger
 Deux tableaux représentant différents costumes des peuples orientaux
 Deux tableaux représentant des animaux, after the drawings by Charles-Nicolas Cochin
 Portrait de feu M. de Boullongne, after Gilles Allou, 1750
 Portrait de M. Le Lorrain, after Claude-Adrien Nonnotte
 La Colère d’Achille
 Adieu d’Hector et d’Andromaque, sujets tirés de l’Iliade d’Homère), after the paintings by Coypel 
 Les Misères de la guerre
 Le Déjeuner flamand (dont le tableau est connu en Flandre sons le nom de La Dévote de Teniers), after David Teniers the Younger.
 L’Apparition de Notre-Seigneur d la Sainte Vierge, estampe gravée, after le Guide (royal gallery of Dresden), 1753
 Portrait de la reine, after the painting by Jean-Marc Nattier, 1755
 La Magdeleine pénitente, after Paolo Pagani, (royal gallery of Dresden), 1757
 Portrait de feu Mme Henriette de France, after Nattier, 1759
 Portrait de M. Lullin, ministre de Genève
 Portrait de Mgr l’archevêque de Bordeaux, after Restout, 1765
 Portrait de M. le prince de Gallitzin, ministre plénipotentiaire en France de la Cour de Russie, after François-Hubert Drouais
 Portrait de M. d’Etemare, after Belle, 1775
 Portrait de Mlle de La Font
 Portrait de M. l’abbé Gourdin, 1777
 Portrait de Dimitri Alexeyevich Gallitzin, after Drouais, 1762

Gallery

References

Citations

Sources

1716 births
1791 deaths
Engravers from Paris
18th-century French engravers